Tangier is a 1946 American film noir mystery film directed by George Waggner and starring Maria Montez, Robert Paige and Sabu. It is set in the international city of Tangier, Morocco and was one of the last final Universal Pictures films before the studio's reorganization as Universal-International in July 1946.

The film features a variety of well-known Universal players completing their contracts, such as Montez, Paige and Louise Allbritton.

The film was produced at the insistence of Montez, who had grown weary of her typecasting in Technicolor oriental adventures.

Plot
In Tangier, disgraced American war correspondent Paul Kenyon, café dancer Rita and local entrepreneur Pepe join forces to battle Adolpho Fernandez, a Nazi diamond smuggler.

Cast
 Maria Montez as Rita
 Robert Paige as Paul Kenyon
 Sabu as Pepe
 Preston Foster as Col. Jose Artiego
 Louise Allbritton as Dolores
 Kent Taylor as Ramon
 J. Edward Bromberg as Alex Rocco
 Reginald Denny as Fernandez
 Charles Judels as Dmitri
 Erno Verebes as Capt. Cartiaz
 Billy Green as Mike
 Dorothy Lawrence as Maid
 Francis McDonald as Sanchez
 George Lynn as Lieutenant
 Joan Fulton as Rocco's Blonde
 Pat Alphin in minor role

Production

Development
Maria Montez became famous in the 1940s appearing in a series of Universal Pictures films set in exotic locales and filmed in color alongside Jon Hall and Sabu, such as Arabian Nights, White Savage and Cobra Woman. In September 1943, Universal announced the upcoming Flame of Stamboul, from a script by Alice Miller, to star Montez, Hall and Turhan Bey (in a role intended for Sabu, who was serving with the military). Paul Malvern was to produce and the film was to be shot in color.

Miller's script was set in Turkey, which had been neutral for most of World War II. However, Universal was concerned about upsetting the Turkish government and filming was postponed.

In March 1945, the project was reactivated as Tangier, and Steve Fisher was hired to rewrite the script. The film was relocated to Tangier and the villains were changed to be agents from Franco's Spain. Later, the nationality of the villains was again changed to an unspecified location.

Montez had been in a dispute with Universal over her casting in romantic fantasy films. She said: "Sudan is making more money than any of the others and Universal thinks that on that account I should appear in more of these films. But I wanted to quit these films when they are at their peak, not on the downbeat. It isn't only that the pictures are all the same, but the stories are one just like the other." However, Montez also said: "Tangier is modern. I play a Spanish girl. I like that."

Filming
Filming began on September 24, 1945. As Bey and Hall were serving with the armed forces, their roles were played by Sabu and Robert Paige respectively. It was Sabu's first film after his return from military duty.

Montez was pregnant during filming.

Choreography was led by Lester Horton.

Reception 
In a contemporary review for The New York Times, critic A. H. Weiler wrote: "Miss Montez' array of clothes is far more impressive than the picture's plot and the people involved in it. ... Preston Foster has been allotted the film's meatiest line. 'There seems to be an element of confusion here,' he says at one point, neatly explaining everything."

See also
 List of American films of 1946

References

External links
 
 
 

1946 films
1940s mystery thriller films
Universal Pictures films
Films directed by George Waggner
Films set in Tangier
American mystery thriller films
American black-and-white films
1940s English-language films
1940s American films